Broadview Creek is a stream in the Broadview neighborhood of Seattle, Washington, United States.

Landforms of Seattle
Rivers of Washington (state)
Rivers of King County, Washington